Samuel J. Creekmore IV (born September 24, 1966) is an American landscape architect and Republican politician. He is a member of the Mississippi House of Representatives, having represented the state's 14th district there since 2020.

Biography 
Samuel J. Creekmore IV was born on September 24, 1966, in Starkville, Mississippi.  Creekmore graduated from Mississippi State University. He is a landscape architect. A resident of New Albany, Mississippi, he was elected to represent Mississippi's 14th House district, composed of Union County, in the Mississippi House of Representatives as a Republican in 2019 and was inaugurated on January 7, 2020.

Personal life 
Creekmore is married to his wife, the former Warner Poindexter. Her uncle, Will Green Poindexter, represented Sunflower County in the Mississippi House of Representatives from 1976 to 1993.

References 

1966 births
Living people
Republican Party members of the Mississippi House of Representatives
People from New Albany, Mississippi